Johnsson is a Swedish surname meaning "son of John".

People with this surname include:
 Andreas Johnsson, Swedish ice hockey player
 Christofer Johnsson, Swedish heavy metal musician
 Kim Johnsson, Swedish ice hockey player
 Peter Johnsson (born 1962), Swedish politician
 Sonja Johnsson, Swedish Swimmer
 William G. Johnsson, former editor of the Adventist Review

See also 
 Jonson 
 Jonsson
 Johanson
 Johansson

Swedish-language surnames
Patronymic surnames
Surnames from given names